Ptychaspididae is a family of trilobites, containing the following genera:

Alborsella
Changia
Eoptychaspis
Eowuhuia
Euptychaspis
Idiomesus
Kathleenella
Keithia
Keithiella
Macronoda
Plectrella
Proricephalus
Ptychaspis
Saukioides
Sunwaptia
Wilcoxaspis

References

Dikelokephaloidea
Trilobite families